The Clearwater station is on the Canadian National Railway mainline in Clearwater, British Columbia, the station is located south side of the North Thompson River (opposite the town site). The station is served by Via Rail's The Canadian as a request stop (48 hours advance notice required).

Footnotes

External links 
Via Rail Station Description

Via Rail stations in British Columbia